Ralph Campbell Sr. (August 4, 1915 – May 15, 1983) was an American postal worker and civil rights activist and organizer active in Raleigh, North Carolina. His wife June was also influential. He worked for the post office. Their son Ralph Campbell Jr. continued their work and was elected state auditor. Another son, Bill Campbell, served as mayor of Atlanta.

He served in World War II and in the Korean War.

Campbell served as president of the Raleigh Chapter of the National Association for the Advancement of Colored People from December 18, 1960 until February 21, 1965. He participated in the 1963 March on Washington for Jobs and Freedom. In the early 1960s, he and June began hosting meetings of civil rights activists at their home. Often sitting around an oval glass-topped table, this group became known as the "Oval Table Gang". Its members strategized to desegregate schools, support black political candidates, and organized protests. The meetings continued until Campbell died.

Campbell and his wife petitioned the Raleigh School board to allow their children to attend white schools. The board agreed to allow Bill, the youngest child, to enroll at the Murphey School, making him the first child to desegregate a school in the city. Campbell worked in a post office and was threatened with dismissal if he accompanied Bill to school, so his wife took Bill to the Murphey School on his day of classes.

After his death in 1983, he was commemorated in a joint resolution by the North Carolina General Assembly. His wife died in 2004. They are buried at Raleigh National Cemetery. In 2005, he and his wife were inducted into the Raleigh Hall of Fame.

References

1915 births
1983 deaths
Ralph
African-American history in Raleigh, North Carolina
NAACP activists